Van Alen may refer to:

People
 Cornelius Van Alen Van Dyck (1818–1895), American missionary
 James Henry Van Alen (1819–1886), American brigadier general
 James I. Van Alen (1772–1822), member of the United States House of Representatives
 James J. Van Alen (1848–1923), sportsman and politician
 Jan van Oolen (1651–1698), also referred to as Jan van Alen, Dutch painter
 Jimmy Van Alen (1902–1991), founder of the International Tennis Hall of Fame
 John Evert Van Alen (1749–1807), American surveyor, merchant, and politician
 John Trumbull Van Alen (d. 1857), American merchant and diplomat
 Margaret Van Alen Bruguiére (1876–1969), American socialite and art collector
 William Van Alen (1883–1954), American architect

Places
 Van Alen Building, a block of flats in Brighton, England, UK
 Van Alen Institute, an architectural institute in New York, New York, US
 Johannis L. Van Alen Farm, an NRHP-listed estate in Stuyvesant, Columbia, New York, US
 Luykas Van Alen House, a Dutch colonial house in Kinderhook, Columbia, New York, US
 John Evert Van Alen House, an NRHP-listed home in Defreestville, Rensselaer, New York, US

See also

 
 Alen (disambiguation)
 Van Allen (disambiguation)

Surnames of Dutch origin